Actus essendi  is a Latin expression coined by Saint Thomas Aquinas (1225–1274). The metaphysical principle of  relates to the revelation of God as He Who is (Ex 3:14), and to how we as humans perceive God’s essence. Aquinas elaborates on the fact that God’s essence is not perceived as sense data; rather, the essence of God can only be understood partially in terms of the limited participations in God’s , that is, in terms of what is real, in terms of God’s effects in the real world.

Overview

The observation that individual subsisting things display instantiations of a particular essence led Aquinas to postulate that what gives actual existence to a subsisting thing and to its essence – the  – is unique, in the sense that the perfection of  cannot be said to be common in the way an essence is said to be common.

The metaphysics of Aristotle did not reach that far.

Aquinas defined God as the "", the subsisting act of being.

See also 
 Actus purus

References

Sources 
Cornelio Fabro, "Participation", New Catholic Encyclopedia, 2nd ed. (Detroit: Gale, 2003) 10:905–910.
Pope John Paul II, Encyclical Letter "Fides et ratio", 14 September 1998, Acta Apostolicae Sedis 91 (1999): 5–88.
Natale Colafati, L'actus essendi in San Tommaso D'Aquino (Messina, Italy: Rubbettino Editore, 1992).
Pope John Paul II, Apostolic Letter "Inter munera Academiarum", 28 January 1999.
Pier P. Ruffinengo, "L' non e ancora l' di San Tommaso", Aquinas: Rivista internazionale di filosofia 38 (1995): 631–635.

Further reading
 Actus essendi and the Habit of the First Principle in Thomas Aquinas (New York: Einsiedler Press, 2019).

Thomism
Concepts in metaphysics